Calamagrostis fulgida is a species of grass in the family Poaceae. It is found only in Ecuador and parts of Chile.

References

fulgida
Flora of Ecuador
Vulnerable plants
Taxonomy articles created by Polbot